The Patharkat  are a Hindu sub-caste found in North India. The majority of this subcaste in Nepal, Kushbadiya, speak a poorly known language, and exhibit enough distinct cultural values to be a separate ethnic group, nevertheless Pattharkat in Kapilbastu District are exceptional as they considered themselves to be Dalit rather than adivasi. In India, they are also known as Sangtarash.

Origin
The Patharkat are a sub-group of the larger Kanjar caste. Their name Patharkat in Hindi literally means stone cutters. Having taken up the profession of stone cutting, this particular group of Kanjars broke all links with the parent community, and the two communities do not now intermarry. They are found mainly in Awadh, and their concentrations are in the districts of Sitapur, Unnao, Raebareli, Hardoi and Lucknow. In Lucknow, they are found mainly in the localities of Qaisar Bagh, Saafatgang, Daligang, Bangla Bazar, Nishatgang, Lal Kuan and Chinhat. They speak Ghiarai among themselves and Hindi with outsiders.

In Bihar, the Patharkat are found in the districts of Champaran, Arrah and Gaya. They are divided into seven exogamous clans, the Sankat, Sanda, Bhains, Marriya, Uthwar, Lahia and Baid. The Patharkat claim to have come from Rajasthan some three hundred years ago.

Present circumstances
The Patharkat are endogamous, but avoid marrying among close, but they have no system of exogamous clans. They are largely a landless and urban community, and their traditional occupation remains the manufacturing of the Hindu idols. The Patharkat now buys stones from quarries in western Uttar Pradesh, and then engrave and cut the stones. A few Patharkat have abandoned their traditional occupation and taken to wage labour. The Indian government has given them scheduled caste status, which allowed some to access affirmative action programmes. They are Hindu, and their customs are similar to other Awadh Hindus.

The Bihar Patharkat are a nomadic community, and many are employed in quarries. They move from place to place, and live in encampments at the edges of towns. The Patharkat are strictly endogamous, and practice clan exogamy. They are almost totally illiterate, and are one of the most deprived community in Bihar.

References

Dom in India
Scheduled Castes of Uttar Pradesh
Scheduled Castes of Bihar